The Charles W. Dean Bridge, known before 1999 as the Great River Bridge, is a planned cable-stayed bridge to carry Interstate 69 and U.S. Route 278 across the Mississippi River between Arkansas City, Arkansas and Benoit, Mississippi.  The Arkansas State Highway and Transportation Department began land acquisition for the project in October 2006, but no funding has been provided for construction.

Preliminary studies indicate the bridge would be 4.25 miles (6.85 km) long, with one 1500-foot (460 m) cable-stayed span over the main channel of the river supported by two 450-foot (137 m) towers.  A cost of $565 million has been estimated.

The structure's name commemorates Charles W. Dean (1927–1998), an engineer from Cleveland, Mississippi who proposed the bridge in 1984.  A Mississippi legislative act named the proposed bridge after Dean in 1999.

History and development
The Great River Bridge was originally proposed by Mississippi engineer Charles W. Dean in 1984.  Originally part of the planned relocation of US-278 through the lower Mississippi Delta, the Federal Highway Administration (FHWA) approved the environmental impact statement (EIS) and issued a Record of Decision (ROD) for the bridge in 2004.

It has been determined that the Charles W. Dean Bridge will also carry Interstate 69, following FHWA approvals for sections of I-69 in Arkansas in 2006 and Mississippi in 2010 that will connect to either end of the bridge.

Project status
The Charles W. Dean Bridge project has cleared all of its environmental and permitting reviews, and is considered "shovel ready," pending the availability of funds for construction. As of 2009, the bridge has been approved by Congress for funding, but has not actually been funded yet. The state of Arkansas began to purchase land for the bridge starting in October, 2006. In its 2011-2013 Statewide Transportation Improvement Plan, the AHTD stated intentions to begin construction of the Arkansas approach roadways and structures in 2011, subject to funding. Construction of the bridge and the remaining connections is contingent upon funding. There has been no construction on the bridge or approaches and minimal upgrades to the I-69 corridor in Arkansas period as of 2021.

In 2017, the status of the bridge was brought to Congress's attention, and plans were floated to make the bridge an active project.

As of 2021, the entire I-69 project in Arkansas seems to be a fairly low priority to AHTD.

See also
List of crossings of the Lower Mississippi River
Greenville Bridge

External links
 Old Man Bridge: Change in the Delta, Oxford American, 2005.
 Charles W. Dean Bridge at website Structurae

Cable-stayed bridges in the United States
Road bridges in Arkansas
Bridges over the Mississippi River
Proposed bridges in the United States
Interstate 69
Towers in Arkansas
Towers in Mississippi
Bridges on the Interstate Highway System
Bridges of the United States Numbered Highway System
Transportation in Desha County, Arkansas
Buildings and structures in Desha County, Arkansas
Road bridges in Mississippi
U.S. Route 278
Interstate vehicle bridges in the United States
Transportation in Bolivar County, Mississippi
Buildings and structures in Bolivar County, Mississippi